Papagaios is a municipality in Minas Gerais, Brazil. Its economy is based on exports of slate.

References

Municipalities in Minas Gerais